Liza Mihinui (born 20 November 1960) is a former New Zealand rugby union player. She played for the Black Ferns on 29 August 1994 against a New South Wales side at Richmond.

Mihinui is the mother of another Black Fern, Huriana Manuel. They were the first mother and daughter Black Ferns after Manuel's debut in 2005.

References

External links 

 Black Ferns Profile

1960 births
Living people
New Zealand female rugby union players
New Zealand women's international rugby union players
Rugby union hookers